The Nikon D810 is a 36.3-megapixel professional-grade full-frame digital single-lens reflex camera produced by Nikon. The camera was officially announced in June 2014, and became available in July 2014.

Compared to the former D800/D800E it offers an image sensor with a base sensitivity of ISO 64 and extended range of ISO 32 to 51,200, an Expeed processor with noise reduction with claimed 1 stop noise improvement, doubled buffer size, increased frame rate and extended battery life, improved autofocus – now similar to the D4S, improved video with 1080p 60 fps and many software improvements.

The D810 was succeeded by the Nikon D850 in August 2017 and was listed as discontinued in December 2019.

Features
 New 37.09 megapixel (36.3 effective) full-frame (35.9×24 mm) sensor with sensitivity of ISO 64–12,800 (ISO 32–51,200 boost) and no optical low-pass filter (OLPF, anti-aliasing filter)
Improved microlenses with increased light gathering
Nikon Expeed 4 image processor with improved noise reduction, moiré (aliasing) reduction and increased battery life to 1200 shots / 40 minutes video notwithstanding 30% higher speed
Roughly doubled buffer size of D800/D800E
Frame rate (photo) increased to 5 fps FX (full-frame, DX up to 7 fps). Videos up to 1080p 60p / 50p fps
Simultaneous video recoding on external recorder (uncompressed video, clean HDMI; up to 1080p60) and compressed on memory card
Autofocus equivalent to D4S, also Group Area mode: uses five AF sensors together. Face-detection switchable with custom settings
Highlight-weighted metering preventing blown highlights or underexposed shadows. Also Highlight Display with Zebra Stripes and full aperture metering during live view and video
 Kevlar/carbon fiber composite shutter with reduced lag, vibrations and shutter noise. Redesigned Sequencer / Balancer Mechanism for Quiet and Quiet Continuous modes
Electronic front curtain shutter for further reduced vibrations enabling higher resolutions
OLED viewfinder display
Timelapse up to 9,999 frames, additionally timelapse videos. Timelapse / Interval Timer Exposure Smoothing
Customizable 'Picture Control 2.0' options: Flat affecting dynamic range (preserve highlights and shadows), Clarity affecting details. Other settings affecting exposure, white balance, sharpness, brightness, saturation, hue; allowing custom curves to be created, edited, saved, exported and imported
3.2" 1229k-dot (RGBW, four dots per pixel: extra white dot) VGA LCD display with "Split-screen display zoom" function
USB 3.0, HDMI C (mini), Nikon 10-Pin interfaces and 3.5 mm / 1/8″ stereo headphone + 3.5 mm / 1/8″ stereo microphone connectors
"Superior" resistance to dust and water (Nikon claim)

Accessories
 Nikon WT-4/WT-4A or WT-5/WT-5A (also UT-1 network) Wireless Transmitter for WLAN. Third-party solutions available.
 Nikon Wireless remote control or third-party solutions.
 Nikon GP-1 or GP-1A GPS Unit for direct GPS geotagging. Third-party solutions partly with three-axis compass, data-logger, bluetooth and support for indoor use are available from Solmeta, Dawn, Easytag, Foolography, Gisteq and Phottix. See comparisons/reviews.
 Nikon Battery grip or third-party solutions
 Various Nikon Speedlight or third-party flash units. Also working as commander for Nikon Creative Lighting System wireless (slave) flash.
 Third-party radio (wireless) flash control triggers
 Tethered shooting with Nikon Camera Control Pro 2, third-party solutions or open-source software and apps
 Other accessories from Nikon and third parties, including protective cases and bags, eyepiece adapters and correction lenses, and underwater housings.
 Nikon D810 animator's kit including the AF-S VR Micro-NIKKOR 105mm f/2.8G, Dragonframe 3.5 software, power supply and cables
 Nikon D810 DSLR Filmmaker's Kit including three fast prime lenses, a portable HDMI recorder using "Pro" codecs, but not capable for storing uncompressed video, ME-1 Stereo Microphone, filters, batteries and cables

Reception

At the time of its release, the Nikon D810 became the Dxomark image sensor leader ahead of the Nikon D800E and received many reviews.

Service advisory
On August 19, 2014, Nikon acknowledged a problem reported by some users, of bright spots appearing in long-exposure photographs, as well as "in some images captured at an Image area setting of 1.2× (30×20)." Existing owners of D810 cameras were asked to visit a website to determine whether their camera could be affected, on the basis of serial numbers. Repairs would be made by Nikon free of charge. If bright spots still appear in images after servicing, Nikon recommends enabling Long exposure NR. Products already serviced have a black dot inside the tripod socket.

Nikon D810A
An astrophotography variant with a special infrared filter capable of deep red / near infrared and with special software tweaks like long-exposure modes up to 15 minutes, virtual horizon indicator and a special Astro Noise Reduction software was announced February 10, 2015. The D810A's IR filter is optimized for H-alpha (Hα) red tones, resulting in four times greater sensitivity to the 656 nm wavelength than the D810. In comparison, Canon's astrophotography DSLRs 20Da and 60Da Hα sensitivity was 2.5 times and 3 times (respectively) more than the standard 20D / 60D. The D810A additionally has 1.39 stops advantage due to the larger image sensor format  resulting in better than 2 stops sensitivity advantage giving over four times faster exposure times compared to the Canon 20Da/60Da.

Although the D810A can be used for normal photography, due to the deep red / near infrared sensitivity the in-camera white balance may fail in case of fluorescent light or difficult cases with very strong infrared light  requiring an external infrared filter. Nikon published an D810A astrophotography guide that recommends live view focusing with 23× enlarged selected areas and a gallery showing the mostly small effects to the color reproduction in "normal" photos.

A review concludes that especially the D810A long exposure noise is superior compared to the D800E and other Nikon fullframes, and shows effects of the increased H-alpha sensitivity. Color balance of "normal" photos seems mostly correct, except comparatively hotter objects with strong infrared radiation and a bit more purple in sunsets.

References

External links

 Nikon D810, Nikon USA
 Nikon D810A, Nikon USA
 Nikon D810 - D800/D800E Comparison Sheet Nikon
 D810-D810A Comparison Sheet Nikon
 Nikon D810 User Manuals, Guides and Software Nikon Download-center
 Nikon D810A User Manuals, Guides and Software Nikon Download-center
 Nikon D810 Review Imaging Resource
 Best camera for astrophotography? Nikon D810A review, Skies & Scopes

D810
D810
Live-preview digital cameras
Cameras introduced in 2014
Full-frame DSLR cameras